A. Padmanabhan (born 14 December 1928) is an Indian former civil servant and politician who was a member of the Indian Administrative Service. He is also a former Governor of the state of Mizoram and a former chief secretary of the government of Tamil Nadu. Having had a career in the governments of Tamil Nadu and the government of India, he now focuses on providing help to the needy by partnering with organizations like the Foundation For Academic Excellence and Access (FAEA) where he is a member of the governing council. He was born in 1929 and did his BA and MA from Pachaiyappa's College in Chennai.

Career 
Padmanabha worked 31 years in Indian Administrative Service (IAS) between 01-05-1956 and 30-06-1987. He served as: 
 Sub Collector Cheranmahadevi 
 Collector of Salem between 8-5-1963 and 12-4-1965 and
 Director in the Department of Employment and Training between 03.09.1968 and	05.07.1969
 Chairman of TIDCO and launched the partnership for SPIC.
 Chairman of SIPCOT and set up the industrial parks in hosur and also other parts of Tamil Nadu.
 Vigilance Commissioner and Commissioner for Administrative reforms 
 Deputy Commissioner Commercial Taxes
 Secretary (CT), Board Of Revenue
 Director Of Fisheries https://fisheries.tn.gov.in/History
 Additional Secretary Industries
 Chairman SIDCO & Managing Director (TANSI)
 Secretary Public Works Department 
 Chairman Electricity Board
 Secretary Health and Family Welfare
 Secretary Industries
 Chief Secretary 
 Advisor To Governor 
 
Padmanabha was instrumental in setting up healthcare and industries in the state of Tamil Nadu. He along with Dr. MGR was instrumental in setting up private educational institutes in Tamil Nadu.

Membership 
 Member of Union Public Service Commission (UPSC) between 17-4-1989 and 13-12-1993

Governor 
A. Padmanabhan was posted as Governor of Mizoram State between 2 May 1998 and 30 November 2000 after Dr. Arun Prasad Mukherjee.

Writer 
Padmanabha has also written several books.

References

1928 births
Living people
Governors of Mizoram
Indian civil servants